The Pennsylvania Association of Staff Nurses and Allied Professionals (PASNAP) is a labor union in Pennsylvania that represents about 8,300 nurses and allied health professionals.

History
Many of the bargaining units which comprise PASNAP were originally organized in the 1960s, 1970s and 1980s by the Pennsylvania Nurses Association (PNA).  However, the majority of PNA's members remained managers (and unable to form a labor union under the National Labor Relations Act) or associate members outside formal collective bargaining units.

Unionized members of PNA became increasingly dissatisfied with the poor representation and low militancy of the nurses association.  In 1994, the Pennsylvania State Education Association (PSEA) raided PNA's private-sector and Temple University Health System bargaining units. SEIU District 1199P raided PNA in 1997, taking over a large unit of state-employed nurses and health professionals. Never eager to engage in collective bargaining, PNA voluntarily shed its remaining collective bargaining unit (composed of nurses in the Pennsylvania State System of Higher Education) by holding an election in which the nurses agreed to affiliate with the Office and Professional Employees International Union.

The nurses, however, remained restless under the leadership of PSEA.  A number of local union leaders within PSEA HealthCare felt the nurses should disaffiliate from PSEA and form an independent union.  At a national meeting of unionized nurses sponsored by the California Nurses Association (CNA) in March 2000, CNA staff approached PSEA HealthCare leaders and suggested forming an independent nurses association associated (but not affiliated) with CNA. Many of the PSEA nurse leaders were receptive to the idea. Although the executive board of PSEA HealthCare approved the dual affiliation with the AFT, 12 local unions (primarily located in southeastern Pennsylvania) held their own meeting on May 24, 2000, and disaffiliated from PSEA. PSEA brought the issue before the National Labor Relations Board (NLRB).  In October 2000, in what was described as a Solomonic decision because it "split the difference," the Pittsburgh region of the NLRB ruled that each local union was free to do as it wished. Seven bargaining units with about 1,000 members became dual affiliates of AFT and PSEA. This organization became known as HealthCare PSEA.  The 12 other bargaining units, with a membership of about 3,500, formed PASNAP.

Collective bargaining
PASNAP has proven to be one of the most militant nurses unions in Pennsylvania, striking or threatening to strike numerous times in its short history as an independent union.  The union led a 23-day nurses' strike in the winter of 2003, one of Pennsylvania's longest health care walkouts.  In April 2010 the union led a month-long strike at Temple University Hospital defeating many hospital demands, including one banning nurses from making public critiques of management policies related to patient care.  The union led a 24-hour strike against the Tennessee based Community Health Systems in December 2010 in Wilkes Barre while the threat of a second strike on May Day 2010 later backed the for profit company off of major healthcare concessions and anti union demands.

PASNAP is also recognized for its aggressive collective bargaining, which has won union members significantly higher wages and improved working conditions. The union's more notable collective bargaining achievements include:
 The contract signed covering over 1,000 RNs after the strike at Temple University Hospital in April 2010 will have experienced staff nurses earn $46.40 per hour.  The union also pushed back on managements demand to cap employee retirement matches at 4.5%, nurses and other healthcare professionals in the system are now eligible for employer retirement matches of 8.5%.
 The next contract signed at Temple will have senior RNs earning $50.13 per hour with all current benefits; retirement, health, and prescription, remaining unchanged.
 The current contract signed at Temple will have senior RNs earning upwards of $57.71 per hour with nurses who have a little as 10 years experience earning $52.45 per hour.

Organizing
PASNAP's initial organizing efforts were not successful.  The union formed a loose association with SEIU 1199P to organize workers wall-to-wall at hospitals near existing collective bargaining units or which provided enhanced collective bargaining power to existing locals.  The union's first organizing campaign was among a unit of 252 licensed practical nurses (LPNs), and two units of other workers (47 business office workers and 140 technical and professional workers), at Wyoming Valley Hospital. SEIU attempted to organize the service and maintenance employees. Management asked The Burke Group, a notorious anti-union consultant, to advise the hospital on strategy and tactics.  The LPNs rejected the union by a mere six votes, leading PASNAP leaders to decry what they saw as "widespread illegal behavior on the part of the employer." PASNAP entered into contract negotiations with the hospital.  But three years later, the technical and professional workers decertified the union when no contract was signed.

PASNAP did not attempt to organize another collective bargaining unit until 2005. The union's next foray into organizing was a small one.  In July 2005, the union organized 17 nurses, nurse practitioners and physician assistants at the Delaware County, Pennsylvania, George W. Hill Correctional Facility.  In March 2006, the union organized a small unit of 40 registered nurses and technicians at Wills Eye Surgical Center in Philadelphia.

The union quickly expanded its organizing program.  In May 2007, 275 registered nurses at Jeanes Hospital (a member of the Temple University Health System) voted to join PASNAP. On July 19, 2007, 400 nurses at Community Medical Center in Scranton voted overwhelmingly to join PASNAP.  The election was the largest nurses' organizing victory in Pennsylvania since over 700 registered nurses at Altoona Regional Health System joined SEIU two months earlier.  In June 2009 nurses and other healthcare professionals at Fair Acres Geriatric Center voted 125 to 70 in favor of joining PASNAP.

In 2013 Nurses at Armstrong County Memorial Hospital near Pittsburgh, a bargaining unit that had originally decided to stay with PSEA during the split in 2000 and now frustrated with the poor representation and lack of militancy of PSEA, aggressively petitioned to join PASNAP.  The nurses voted 200 to 30 to join PASNAP with 4 voting for no union.  Soon afterwards, unrepresented technical and professional employees at the same hospital petitioned to join PASNAP.  Encouraged by the presence of the new union, the previously non union workers voted 82-27 to join PASNAP.

Union organizing from PASNAP was highly successful throughout 2016. In January, PASNAP successfully led unionizing campaigns two major Philadelphia-are hospitals: Delaware County Memorial Hospital (DCMH) and Hahnemann University Hospital, for a total of 1200 organized nurses. In April, PASNAP successfully formed a union amongst staff nurses at Einstein Medical Center in Philadelphia, who voted in favor (54%-46%). The hospital and PASNAP engaged in negotiations which have moved toward an accepted contract that was overwhelmingly ratified.  In the meantime, St. Christopher's Hospital for Children had also voted to form a PASNAP-led union. 2016 also saw the successful organization of Eagleville Hospital, primarily a drug rehabilitation hospital in Montgomery County.

In September 2016, Nurses at Pottstown Memorial Medical Center in Montgomery County, Pennsylvania voted 189 to 129 to join a PASNAP.The Pottstown local reached their first bargaining agreement in October 2018, after a change of hospital ownership and an unsuccessful effort to decertify the unit.

Legislative and Nursing Practice Activity
PASNAP has been very active politically since its inception.  It began pressing for an end to mandatory overtime in 2001, and drafted a bill which was introduced in the Pennsylvania General Assembly banning the practice in acute-care hospitals in 2002. The union has been able to get the measure reintroduced in each successive legislative session.

PASNAP, and unions in general, will be directly affected by National Right to Work laws.  If Pennsylvania were to become a RTW state, PASNAP would risk losing dues paying members as well as agency fee payers because these members would have a choice of union membership or not.  This differs currently in Pennsylvania and 22 other states where unions and employers are free to negotiate "union security" agreements wherein all members of the collective bargaining group are required to become a member of the union, despite personal beliefs.  These are variously called "fair share agreements" or "forced unionism".  Unions who have been elected the exclusive agent are generally required to represent all employees within the bargaining unit, creating the "free rider" problem.

As part of its campaign to end mandatory overtime, the union has repeatedly polled Pennsylvania nurses about their hours, the acuity (level of illness) of their patients, and patient load.  In 2001, the union's independently-conducted poll of 6,000 registered nurses in the state found that 56 percent of nurses would enter the profession today due to mandatory overtime and poor nurse-to-patient staffing ratios. At the time, the poll was the largest survey of RNs ever conducted in Pennsylvania. In 2004, a second poll of more than 2,500 registered nurses in the southeastern Pennsylvania region found that nearly one in three nurses planned to quit nursing within the next five years due to long working hours.

The bill eventually passed the state house and went into effect on July 1, 2009. A subsequent bill to mandate minimum nurse-to-patient ratios (so-called "safe staffing" legislation) was introduced in the Pennsylvania State House on September 26, 2011, advanced substantially by PASNAP.

Notes

References
 Allabaugh, Denise. "Nurses Going Back to Work." Wilkes-Barre Citizen's Voice. February 15, 2003.
 Allabaugh, Denise. "W-B General Hospital RNs Strike Today." Wilkes-Barres Citizens' Voice. January 30, 2003.
 Axelrod, Daniel. "CMC Nurses Union Goes National." The Scranton Times-Tribune. January 11, 2008.
 Boehm, C. "PASNAP Targets Mandatory Overtime." Revolution. May–June 2005.
 Brenner, Rochelle. "Pa. Nurses Fed Up With Short Staffing." York Dispatch. November 14, 2001.
 Brubaker, Harold. "Pa. Nurses Union to Add to Clout Through Merger." The Philadelphia Inquirer. January 11, 2008.
 "Butler Memorial Reaches Nurses Pact." Pittsburgh Business Times. February 24, 2005.
 Carey, Kathleen E. "Prison Nurses Decide They Want to Unionize." Delaware County Times. July 24, 2005.
 "Crozer-Chester Avoids Strike." Philadelphia Business Journal. June 1, 2005.
 Dobo, Nicole. "Nurses at CMC Approve Union." The Scranton Times-Tribune. August 9, 2007.
 Fennick, Renita. "Hospital Workers Boot Union." Wilkes-Barre Times-Leader. November 2, 2004.
 "FNHP Welcomes Pennsylvania Nurses' Group." Healthwire. January–February 2001.
 George, John. "Nurses Union Lobbying to End Overtime Rules." Philadelphia Business Journal. May 21, 2004.
 George, John. "Wills Eye Workers Vote to Unionize." Philadelphia Business Journal. March 27, 2006.
 Glover, Lynne. "Safe Staffing and Quality Care Act Introduced." Pittsburgh Business Times. June 28, 2002.
 Hartman, Brenda. "Nurses OK New 5-Year Contract." Wilkes-Barre Times-Leader. October 12, 2005.
 "The History of Collective Bargaining in the Commonwealth of Pennsylvania. Part Three: A Timeline of Important Dates."  Labor in the News. Governor’s Office of Administration, Bureau of Labor Relations.  May 2007.
 Hoffman, Audrey. "Nursing Woes at Temple." Philadelphia City Paper. September 11–17, 2003.
 Jackson, M. Paul. "Union Says Wilkes-Barre, Pa., Hospital Swayed Nurses in Unionization Vote." Wilkes-Barre Times-Leader. July 17, 2001.
 "Jeanes Hospital Nurses Unionize." Philadelphia Business Journal. May 17, 2007.
 Logue, Timothy. "Nurses Overwhelmingly Approve Strike Authorization." Delaware County Times. June 7, 2002.
 McKay, Jim. "NLRB Gives Each Side A Partial Win." Pittsburgh Post-Gazette. October 31, 2000.
 "Mercy Fitzgerald, Nurses Ink Labor Pact." Philadelphia Business Journal. October 8, 2004.
 "Nurses Rally for Bill Easing Mandatory OT." Pittsburgh Post-Gazette. May 6, 2001.
 "Pennsylvania Nurses Association Files Complaint vs. PSEA." Press release.  Pennsylvania Nurses Association. May 12, 1994.
 Pilla, Louis. "Pennsylvania Nurses Create New Collective Bargaining Unit." Nurses.com. May 31, 2000. Accessed August 9, 2007.
 "Phila.-Area Nurses Union Affiliating With National Group." Philadelphia Business Journal. January 10, 2008.
 "Scranton CMC Nurses Vote in Favor of Union Representation." Wilkes-Barre Times-Leader. August 9, 2007.
 "Temple Health Nurses Approve 3-Year Contract." The Philadelphia Inquirer. November 11, 2007.
 "Temple Nurses Agree to Contract." Philadelphia Business Journal. October 2, 2006.

External links
 PASNAP Web page

Trade unions in Pennsylvania
Trade unions established in 2000
National Nurses United
State wide trade unions in the United States
Medical and health organizations based in Pennsylvania